In urban planning, a core city, principal city metropolitan core, or central city, is the largest or most important city or cities of a metropolitan area. A core city is surrounded by smaller satellite cities, towns, and suburbs. A central city is usually the first settlement established in an urban region before the outlying districts came into existence, later in history. Central cities often form the regional downtowns of metro areas. The term is used mainly in US context, although since the 1970s it has also become relatively common in Canada and, to a lesser extent, Europe and Australia.

Examples

Metropolitan areas with one core city
The followings are the core city of the five largest metropolitan areas in the world.

Metropolitan areas with more than one core city

See also
 Satellite city
 Edge city
 Commuter town

References

Further reading

External links
High-Income World: Core Cities and Densification. Demographia

Urbanization
Urban studies and planning terminology
Cities by type